Liis Pello (born 7 February 1988) is an Estonian footballer who plays as a midfielder and has appeared for the Estonia women's national team.

Career
Pello has been capped for the Estonia national team, appearing for the team during the 2019 FIFA Women's World Cup qualifying cycle.

She plays for FC Kirkop United in Malta.

References

External links
 
 
 

1988 births
Living people
People from Keila
Estonian women's footballers
Estonia women's international footballers
Women's association football midfielders
Estonian expatriate footballers
Expatriate footballers in Malta
Estonian expatriate sportspeople in Malta